Paarangot Jyeshtadevan Namboodiri (AD 1500–1610) was a mathematician and astronomer from Kerala, South India.

Jyestadevan Namboodiri was born in Paaragottu Mana near Thrikkandiyur and Aalathur on the banks of river Nila. Vatasseri Damodaran Namboodiri was his teacher. He wrote a commentary in Malayalam, Yukthi Bhaasha for Kelallur Neelakandhan Somayaji's Thanthra Sangraham. He is also the author of Drik Karanam (AD 1603), a comprehensive treatise in Malayalam on Astronomy.

See also
Indian astronomy
Indian mathematics
Jyeshthadeva

References

Kerala school of astronomy and mathematics
Malayalam-language writers
Writers from Kerala
16th-century Indian astronomers
16th-century Indian mathematicians
Scientists from Kerala
Scholars from Kerala